Kinshasa–Brazzaville is a transborder agglomeration comprising Kinshasa, the capital of the Democratic Republic of the Congo, and Brazzaville, the capital of the Republic of the Congo, which face each other across the Congo River. In addition to being the closest national capitals by proximity, it is the third largest urban agglomeration on the African continent, behind Lagos and Greater Cairo. The two cities currently do not have a bridge between each other, and numerous attempts to link the two by bridge have yet to materialize.

Airline connections
There are commercial airline flights between the two cities on ASKY Airlines; the flights, among the shortest international flights in the world, last about five minutes each way, usually.

References

Kinshasa
Brazzaville
Transborder agglomerations